Mooch or Mooche may refer to:

People
 Albert "Mooch" Harrell, a member of the Distants (1959–1960), a vocal group related to The Temptations
 Steve Mariucci (born 1955), American football coach and NFL Network analyst, nicknamed "Mooch"
 Glenn Myernick (1954–2006), American soccer player nicknamed "Mooch"
 Anthony Scaramucci (born 1964), American financier and political figure nicknamed "The Mooch"

Fictional characters
 Mooch (Underdog), a villain in the 1964-1967 animated television series
 Mooch, a dog in the 1971 television film Mooch Goes to Hollywood
 Mooch, a cat in the comic strip Mutts
 Mooch, a dog in 101 Dalmatians: The Series, a 1997–1998 animated television series
 Mooch, a fox in the 1997–1998 short segment series "Maurice & Mooch" in The Wacky World of Tex Avery, an animated television series
 Mooch, a fly in the 2009 animated film G-Force
 Mike "Mooch" Cacciatore, in Wiseguy, an American 1987-90 crime drama television series

Other uses
 Mooch Goes to Hollywood, also titled Mooch, a 1971 television movie
 Mooch, a dance move in the early 1900s dance Black Bottom
 "The Mooche", a 1928 jazz song sometimes spelled Mooch
 Mooch, or Scaramucci, a period of 10 or 11 days
 Mooch, someone/group who leaches off other people. Example: Googong and Canberra.

See also
 Mafeking Mooch, an affected style of walking
 Mooching rod, a fishing rod used in centerpin fishing
 Moochie (disambiguation)
 Moocher (disambiguation)
 
 

Lists of people by nickname